Diane Cook is an American writer.

Diane or Dianne Cook may also refer to:
 Diane Cook (photographer), American photographer
 Diane G. Cook, American Parkinson's disease advocate
 Diane J. Cook, American computer scientist
 Dianne Cook (basketball), former Australian women's basketball player
 Dianne Cook (statistician), Australian statistician